Knut Olavson Mevasstaul (1785–1862) was a Norwegian rose painter (norsk rosemaler).

He was from Kviteseid in Telemark, Norway. He was trained in the decorative folk art of Rosemaling in the traditional style of Vest-Telemark in Upper Telemark. The Telemark style of decorative, ornamental painting is commonly asymmetrical with motives of leaves and blooming flowers that are varied and irregular. His festive, richly designed rococo vines and fine rolling marbling are found in a variety of room decorations in Telemark,  including in  Morgedal and Seljord. Many of his works have been retained, both complete painted rooms as well as smaller objects such as chests.

References

Related reading
Ellingsgard, Nils (1999)  Norsk rosemåling – Dekorativ måling i folkekunsten (Oslo, Det norske samlaget)

External links
Rosemåling  Historikk

1785 births
1862 deaths
People from Kviteseid
Folk artists
19th-century Norwegian painters
Norwegian male painters
19th-century Norwegian male artists